John Vargas (born June 17, 1961) is an American water polo player. He competed in the men's tournament at the 1992 Summer Olympics.

References

External links
 

1961 births
Living people
American male water polo players
Olympic water polo players of the United States
Water polo players at the 1992 Summer Olympics
Sportspeople from Fullerton, California
American water polo coaches
United States men's national water polo team coaches
Water polo coaches at the 2000 Summer Olympics